Medicago murex or spiny medick is a plant species of the genus Medicago. It is found throughout the Mediterranean basin. It forms a symbiotic relationship with the bacterium Sinorhizobium medicae, which is capable of nitrogen fixation.

External links
 International Legume Database & Information Services

murex
Flora of Lebanon and Syria
Flora of Malta